The 100 may refer to:

Arts and entertainment
 100 (DC Comics), fictional organized crime groups appearing in DC Comics
 The 100 (novel series), a 2013–2016 science fiction novel series written by Kass Morgan
 The 100 (TV series), 2014 American post-apocalyptic drama based on Kass Morgan's novel series
 The Hundred with Andy Lee a 2021 Australian comedy, panel television game show

Other uses
 The One Hundred (band), an electronic and metal crossover band from London
 The Hundred (cricket), a professional 100-ball cricket league in England and Wales
 The 100: A Ranking of the Most Influential Persons in History, a 1978 book by Michael H. Hart

See also
 100 (disambiguation)
 Centurion